Rana Asif Tauseef (born 1 July 1967 in Faisalabad, Punjab) is a Pakistani politician from Faisalabad who has served as a member of the National Assembly (MNA) after being elected in the 2002 general elections. He was a member of the Pakistan Muslim League (N) political party. In the 2008 general elections, he was again elected as an MNA, this time as a candidate from Pakistan Muslim League (Q). Asif is a businessman by profession and obtained his Bachelors in Commerce degree in 1991 from the Government Commerce College and an MBA degree in 1996 from the London School of Business Administration.

In May 2011, he assumed the post of Minister of State for Privatisation. His areas of expertise and interest include finance, commerce and industry. Asif has been a member of the National Assembly's committees on Culture, Sports, Tourism, Youth Affairs, Population Welfare, Foreign Affairs, Economic Affairs and Textile. His brother, Rana Zahid Tauseef, has also served as an MNA in the national parliament and has been a mayor of the city of Faisalabad.
Political Career:
He won 2008 General Elections by the help of Rana Aftab Ahmad Khan, Rana Aftab was Nazim of UC-139 he helped him in his election campaigns, Rana Aftab is Politician from Faisalabad and also a well known businessman in Osaka, Japan.
Now He Has Join Pakistan Tehreek-e-Insaf (December 2016)

References

1967 births
Living people
Pakistan Muslim League (N) politicians
Pakistan Muslim League (Q) politicians
Pakistani Sunni Muslims
People from Faisalabad
Politicians from Punjab, Pakistan
Punjabi people